Ida Gabriella Stenberg (9 January 1923 – 20 September 2011) was a Swedish actress. She appeared in forty films between 1936 and 1994.

Selected filmography

 Kiss Her! (1940)
 With Open Arms (1940)
 The Train Leaves at Nine (1941)
 Poor Ferdinand (1941)
 Dunungen (1941)
 Goransson's Boy (1941)
 The Green Lift (1944)
 Don't Give Up (1947)
 No Way Back (1947)
 Dinner for Two (1947)
 Thirst (1949)
 Hendes store aften (1954)
 Night Light (1957)
 Mother Takes a Vacation (1957)
 Miss April (1958)
 The Koster Waltz (1958)
 Sängkammartjuven (1959)
 Sune's Christmas (1991)

References

External links
 

1923 births
2011 deaths
Swedish film actresses
Swedish stage actresses
Swedish television actresses
Swedish soap opera actresses
Actresses from Tokyo
20th-century Swedish actresses